"Are You Ready?" is a song written by Charlie Allen and John Hill and performed by Pacific Gas & Electric.  It reached No. 14 on the Billboard Hot 100 and No. 49 on the R&B chart in 1970.  The song was featured on their 1970 album Are You Ready?

The song was produced by John Hill and featured the back-up vocal group The Blackberries.

This song, which was nearly 6 minutes in length on the album version, had to be cut down to 3 minutes in the single edit version, due to its length, resulting in omitting the slower recitative Introduction, the omission of the first verse, ("People say he won't come", pertaining to the unmentioned Jesus Christ, which was considered too controversial for AM airplay, especially in the Rural areas, the Deep South, and the Bible Belt sections of the United States.) and shortening the instrumental and the repeated call and response sections in the coda. ("Yes, I'm Ready", and "Yes, Yes, I'm Ready".) The edit version ends with the fading repeat of the Chorus section.

The single was ranked No. 93 on Billboard's Year-End Hot 100 singles of 1970. Music critic Robert Christgau has called it "easily [the band's] best cut ever".

Charts

Weekly charts

Year-end charts

Other versions
DeGarmo and Key released a version of the song on their 1984 album, Communication.
The Staple Singers released a version of the song as a single in 1985 and it reached No. 39 on the R&B chart.

References

1970 songs
1970 singles
1985 singles
Pacific Gas & Electric (band) songs
The Staple Singers songs
Columbia Records singles